Washington County is a county located in the U.S. state of Georgia. As of the 2020 census, the population was 19,988. The county seat is Sandersville. The county was established on February 25, 1784. It was named for Revolutionary War general (and afterward President of the United States) George Washington.

Geography

The western portion of Washington County, west of a north-to-south line running through Sandersville, is located in the Lower Oconee River sub-basin of the Altamaha River basin. The northeastern portion of the county, north of Riddleville, is located in the Upper Ogeechee River sub-basin of the Ogeechee River basin, while the southeastern portion, centered on Harrison, is located in the Ohoopee River sub-basin of the Altamaha River basin.

Major highways

  State Route 15
  State Route 24
  State Route 24 Spur
  State Route 57
  State Route 68
  State Route 88
  State Route 102
  State Route 231
  State Route 242
  State Route 272
  State Route 540 (Fall Line Freeway)

Adjacent counties
 Glascock County (northeast)
 Jefferson County (east)
 Johnson County (south)
 Wilkinson County (southwest)
 Baldwin County (west)
 Hancock County (northwest)

Demographics

2020 census

As of the 2020 United States census, there were 19,988 people, 7,503 households, and 5,315 families residing in the county.

2010 census
As of the 2010 United States Census, there were 21,187 people, 7,547 households, and 5,269 families living in the county. The racial makeup of the county was 52.7% black or African American, 45.0% white, 0.5% Asian, 0.1% American Indian, 0.7% from other races, and 1.0% from two or more races. Those of Hispanic or Latino origin made up 1.9% of the population. In terms of ancestry, 10.4% were American.

Of the 7,547 households, 35.4% had children under the age of 18 living with them, 42.8% were married couples living together, 22.4% had a female householder with no husband present, 30.2% were non-families, and 27.2% of all households were made up of individuals. The average household size was 2.56 and the average family size was 3.10. The median age was 38.9 years.

The median income for a household in the county was $31,382 and the median income for a family was $41,055. Males had a median income of $35,699 versus $24,860 for females. The per capita income for the county was $15,033. About 19.0% of families and 27.6% of the population were below the poverty line, including 35.6% of those under age 18 and 18.2% of those age 65 or over.

2000 census
As of the census of 2000, there were 21,176 people, 7,435 households, and 5,382 families living in the county.  The population density was 31 people per square mile (12/km2).  There were 8,327 housing units at an average density of 12 per square mile (5/km2).  The racial makeup of the county was 53.20% Black or African American, 45.73% White, 0.17% Native American, 0.26% Asian, 0.01% Pacific Islander, 0.20% from other races, and 0.43% from two or more races.  0.63% of the population were Hispanic or Latino of any race.

There were 7,435 households, out of which 34.60% had children under the age of 18 living with them, 46.70% were married couples living together, 21.50% had a female householder with no husband present, and 27.60% were non-families. 24.80% of all households were made up of individuals, and 10.60% had someone living alone who was 65 years of age or older.  The average household size was 2.65 and the average family size was 3.17.

In the county, the population was spread out, with 26.90% under the age of 18, 8.80% from 18 to 24, 30.30% from 25 to 44, 21.40% from 45 to 64, and 12.60% who were 65 years of age or older.  The median age was 36 years. For every 100 females there were 81.50 males.  For every 100 females age 18 and over, there were 75.20 males.
The median income for a household in the county was $29,910, and the median income for a family was $36,325. Males had a median income of $33,263 versus $21,388 for females. The per capita income for the county was $15,565.  About 18.70% of families and 22.90% of the population were below the poverty line, including 30.00% of those under age 18 and 23.20% of those age 65 or over.

Education
The county is served by the Washington County School District, which includes:
 Ridge Road Elementary School
 T.J. Elder Middle School
 Washington County High School.

The county is also the location of one privately run school:
 Brentwood School

Communities

Cities
 Davisboro
 Oconee
 Sandersville (county seat)
 Tennille

Towns
 Deepstep
 Harrison
 Riddleville

Census-designated places
 Warthen

Other unincorporated communities
 Goat Town
 Irwins Crossroads
 Pringle
 Sun Hill

In popular culture

The 1933 short story The People's Choice by Erskine Caldwell is set in Washington County, where the story's protagonist is a popular local politician elected again and again as the county's tax assessor.

The biography of one of the main characters (Grant Alexander) in the 2011 console game "X-Men: Destiny" states that they were born in Sandersville, Georgia.

Politics
Like most other majority-minority counties in the South, Washington County has primarily backed Democratic Party candidates for most of its history. Democratic margins of victory in presidential elections were far greater prior to 1964, but the county has only failed to back a Democratic presidential candidate five times in its history. However, no candidate of any party since Bill Clinton in 1996 has managed to win the county by a margin of 1,000 votes or greater.

See also

 Central Savannah River Area
 National Register of Historic Places listings in Washington County, Georgia
List of counties in Georgia

References

Further reading
 Ella Mitchell, History of Washington County. Atlanta, GA: Byrd Printing Company, 1924. —Reissued 1973.

External links
 Official page of Washington County

 
Georgia (U.S. state) counties
1784 establishments in Georgia (U.S. state)
Populated places established in 1784
Black Belt (U.S. region)
Majority-minority counties in Georgia